John Allen Fraser,  (born December 15, 1931) is a Canadian retired parliamentarian and former Speaker of the House of Commons.

Fraser was born in Yokohama, Japan, where his father was working as a lumber salesman. His parents returned to British Columbia when Fraser was four years old. He grew up and was educated there and graduated from the University of British Columbia Faculty of Law in Spring 1954. Fraser first won a seat in Parliament in the 1972 general election as a Progressive Conservative from Vancouver. He stood as a candidate at the 1976 Progressive Conservative leadership convention to replace Robert Stanfield, but did poorly. He was re-elected in 1974, 1979, 1980, 1984 and 1988.

In 1979, Fraser became Minister of the Environment in the short-lived government of Joe Clark, returning to the Opposition benches in 1980. He returned to the Cabinet in the wake of Brian Mulroney's landslide victory in the 1984 federal election, and became Minister of Fisheries and Oceans. He was forced to resign in 1985 as a result of the "Tainted Tuna" affair.

In 1986, he became Speaker of the House of Commons of Canada, the first to be elected by fellow Members of Parliament, and served in that capacity until his retirement in 1993.

Honours
In 1995, he was made an Officer of the Order of Canada. In 2002, he was the recipient of the Vimy Award, which recognizes a Canadian who has made a significant and outstanding contribution to the defence and security of our nation and the preservation of our democratic values.

References

External links

Speakers of the House of Commons of Canada
Postmasters General of Canada
Canadian King's Counsel
Members of the 21st Canadian Ministry
Members of the 24th Canadian Ministry
Members of the House of Commons of Canada from British Columbia
Members of the King's Privy Council for Canada
Lawyers in British Columbia
People from Yokohama
Politicians from Vancouver
Officers of the Order of Canada
Members of the Order of British Columbia
Progressive Conservative Party of Canada MPs
Canadian Anglicans
1931 births
Living people
Peter A. Allard School of Law alumni
Progressive Conservative Party of Canada leadership candidates